James Cobb may refer to:

 James Cobb (librettist) (1756–1818), English librettist
 James E. Cobb (1835–1903), Alabama congressman in the U.S. House of Representatives
 Jimmy Cobb (1929–2020), American jazz musician
 J. R. Cobb (James Barney Cobb Jr., 1944–2019), American guitarist and songwriter
 Jim Cobb, American politician in the Tennessee House of Representatives